The following is a list of massacres that have occurred in the Palestinian territories since 1967.

 For massacres that have occurred in Roman Judea prior to the establishment of the Roman province of Syria Palæstina, see List of massacres in Roman Judea.
 For massacres that took place prior to the British Mandate, see List of massacres in Ottoman Syria.
 For massacres that took place in Mandatory Palestine, see List of killings and massacres in Mandatory Palestine. 
 For massacres that took place during the 1948 Palestine War, see Killings and massacres during the 1948 Palestine War.
 For massacres in Israel see List of massacres in Israel

See also
 List of massacres in Israel
 List of massacres in Palestine

References

Massacres